
Gmina Olesno is a rural gmina (administrative district) in Dąbrowa County, Lesser Poland Voivodeship, in southern Poland.

Villages
Gmina Olesno contains the villages and settlements of Adamierz, Ćwików, Dąbrówka Gorzycka, Dąbrówki Breńskie, Niwki, Oleśnica, Olesno, Pilcza Żelichowska, Podborze, Swarzów, Wielopole and Zalipie.

Neighbouring gminas
Gmina Olesno is bordered by the gminas of Bolesław, Dąbrowa Tarnowska, Gręboszów, Mędrzechów and Żabno.

References
Polish official population figures 2006

Olesno
Gmina Olesno